Augustine "Austin" Amamchukwu Ejide (born 8 April 1984) is a Nigerian football goalkeeper who plays for Israeli club Sektzia Ness Ziona. His name, Amamchukwu, means "I know God".

Born in Onitsha, Anambra State, Ejide has played for Gabros International and SC Bastia in Corsica, which competes in Ligue 2 of the French Football League. He played for Israeli Premier side Hapoel Be'er Sheva until May 2015, and is now playing for Hapoel Hadera F.C.

Club career
Ejide started his career with Gabros International where he had an amazing season before joining Étoile du Sahel. With the Tunisian club, he reached two CAF Champions League finals. In 2006, Ejide joined SC Bastia of the French Ligue 2, where he spent three years before moving to Israeli team Hapoel Petah Tikva. Where he rescued the team from relegation. Ejide moved to Hapoel Be'er Sheva in 2012, where he played until the end of the 2014\2015 season. 2017/2018 Ejide kept 27 games and gracefully kept 15 clean sheets. The shot stopper earned a spot for Hapoel Hadera F.C in the Israel Premier League. The gentle giant is considered a Saviour in the city of Hadera for bringing them back to League 1 after 39 years of being in the Second or Third League.

International career
Ejide made his debut for Nigeria against Namibia on 16 June 2001. He has been named in three FIFA World Cup squads: 2002 in Japan and South Korea, 2010 in South Africa, and 2014 in Brazil. He has also been a member of the Super Eagles' squad at five Africa Cup of Nations tournaments: 2004, 2006, 2008, 2010 and 2013, winning the competition in the latter. In 2013, he was selected for Nigeria's squad at the FIFA Confederations Cup.
 
In the 2008, Africa Cup of Nations hosted in Ghana, Nigeria coach Berti Vogts selected Ejide as first choice goalkeeper, ahead of Vincent Enyeama, in all of Super Eagles' four matches. On 21 January 2008, he played his first AFCON game as Nigeria lost 2–1 to Ivory Coast in the first match of Group B. However, he kept clean sheets in Nigeria's 0–0 draw with Mali and 2–0 win over Benin.

References

External links 

1984 births
Living people
Sportspeople from Onitsha
Nigerian footballers
Association football goalkeepers
Ifeanyi Ubah F.C. players
Étoile Sportive du Sahel players
SC Bastia players
Hapoel Petah Tikva F.C. players
Hapoel Be'er Sheva F.C. players
Hapoel Hadera F.C. players
Sektzia Ness Ziona F.C. players
Ligue 2 players
Israeli Premier League players
Liga Leumit players
Nigeria international footballers
Nigerian expatriate footballers
Expatriate footballers in Tunisia
Expatriate footballers in France
Expatriate footballers in Israel
Nigerian expatriate sportspeople in Tunisia
Nigerian expatriate sportspeople in France
Nigerian expatriate sportspeople in Israel
2002 FIFA World Cup players
2004 African Cup of Nations players
2006 Africa Cup of Nations players
2008 Africa Cup of Nations players
2010 Africa Cup of Nations players
2010 FIFA World Cup players
2013 Africa Cup of Nations players
2013 FIFA Confederations Cup players
2014 FIFA World Cup players
Africa Cup of Nations-winning players